The Cenomanian-Turonian boundary event, also known as the Cenomanian-Turonian extinction, Cenomanian-Turonian oceanic anoxic event (OAE 2), and referred to also as the Bonarelli event, was one of two anoxic extinction events in the Cretaceous period. (The other being the earlier Selli event, or OAE 1a, in the Aptian.) The Cenomanian-Turonian oceanic anoxic event is considered to be the most recent truly global oceanic anoxic event in Earth's geologic history. Selby et al. in 2009 concluded the OAE 2 occurred approximately 91.5 ± 8.6 Ma, though estimates published by Leckie et al. (2002) are given as 93–94 Ma. The Cenomanian-Turonian boundary has been refined in 2012 to 93.9 ± 0.15 Ma. There was a large carbon cycle disturbance during this time period, signified by a large positive carbon isotope excursion. However, apart from the carbon cycle disturbance, there were also large disturbances in the oxygen and sulphur cycles of the ocean.

Background 
The Cenomanian and Turonian stages were first noted by D'Orbigny between 1843 and 1852. The global type section for this boundary is located in the Bridge Creek Limestone Member of the Greenhorn Formation near Pueblo, Colorado, which are bedded with the Milankovitch orbital signature. Here, a positive carbon-isotope event is clearly shown, although none of the characteristic, organic-rich black shale is present. It has been estimated that the isotope shift lasted approximately 850,000 years longer than the black shale event, which may be the cause of this anomaly in the Colorado type section. A significantly expanded OAE2 interval from southern Tibet documents a complete, more detailed, and finer-scale structures of the positive carbon isotope excursion that contains multiple shorter-term carbon isotope stages amounting to a total duration of 820 ±25 ka.

The boundary is also known as the Bonarelli event because of  layer of thick, black shale that marks the boundary and was first studied by Guido Bonarelli in 1891. It is characterized by interbedded black shales, chert and radiolarian sands and is estimated to span a 400,000-year interval. Planktonic foraminifera do not exist in this Bonarelli level, and the presence of radiolarians in this section indicates relatively high productivity and an availability of nutrients. In the Western Interior Seaway, the Cenomanian-Turonian boundary event is associated with the Benthonic Zone, characterised by a higher density of benthic foraminifera relative to planktonic foraminifera, although the timing of the appearance of the Benthonic Zone is not uniformly synchronous with the onset of the oceanic anoxic event and is thus cannot be used to consistently demarcate its beginning.

Cenomanian-Turonian event

Timeline 
Biodiversity patterns of planktic foraminifera indicate that the Cenomanian-Turonian extinction occurred in five phases. Phase I, which took place from 313,000 to 55,000 years before the onset of the anoxic event, witnessed a stratified water column and high planktonic foraminiferal diversity, suggesting a stable marine environment. Phase II, characterised by significant environmental perturbations, lasted from 55,000 years before OAE2 until its onset and witnessed a decline in rotaliporids and heterohelicids, a zenith of schackoinids and hedbergellids, a ‘large form eclipse’ during which foraminifera exceeding 150 microns disappeared, and the start of a trend of dwarfism among many foraminifera. This phase also saw an enhanced oxygen minimum zone and increased productivity in surface waters. Phase III lasted for 100,000 to 900,000 years and was coincident with the Bonarelli Level's deposition and exhibited extensive proliferation of radiolarians, indicative of extremely eutrophic conditions. Phase IV lasted for around 35,000 years and was most notable for the increase in the abundance of hedbergellids and schackoinids, being extremely similar to Phase II, with the main difference being that rotaliporids were absent from Phase IV. Phase V was a recovery interval lasting 118,000 years and marked the end of the ‘large form eclipse’ that began in Phase II; heterohelicids and hedbergellids remained in abundance during this phase, pointing to continued environmental disturbance during this phase.

Causes 
One possible cause of this event is sub-oceanic volcanism, possibly the Caribbean large igneous province, with increased activity approximately 500,000 years earlier. During that period, the rate of crustal production reached its highest level for 100 million years. This was largely caused by the widespread melting of hot mantle plumes under the ocean crust, at the base of the lithosphere. This may have resulted in the thickening of the oceanic crust in the Pacific and Indian Oceans. The resulting volcanism would have sent large quantities of carbon dioxide into the atmosphere, leading to an increase in global temperatures. Within the oceans, the emission of SO2, H2S, CO2, and halogens would have increased the acidity of the water, causing the dissolution of carbonate, and a further release of carbon dioxide. When the volcanic activity declined, this run-away greenhouse effect would have likely been put into reverse. The increased CO2 content of the oceans could have increased organic productivity in the ocean surface waters. The consumption of this newly abundant organic life by aerobic bacteria would produce anoxia and mass extinction. The resulting elevated levels of carbon burial would account for the black shale deposition in the ocean basins.

Large igneous provinces and their possible contribution 
Several independent events related to large igneous provinces (LIP) occurred around the time of OAE2. Within the time period from about 95 to 90 million years ago, two separate LIP events occurred; the Madagascar and the Caribbean-Colombian. Trace metals such as chromium (Cr), scandium (Sc), copper (Cu) and cobalt (Co) have been found at the Cenomanian-Turonian boundary, which suggests that an LIP could have been one of the main basic causes involved in the contribution of the event. The timing of the peak in trace metal concentration coincides with the middle of the anoxic event, suggesting that the effects of the LIPs may have occurred during the event, but may not have initiated the event. Other studies linked the lead (Pb) isotopes of OAE-2 to the Caribbean-Colombian and the Madagascar LIPs. A modeling study performed in 2011 confirmed that it is possible that a LIP may have initiated the event, as the model revealed that the peak amount of carbon dioxide degassing from volcanic LIP degassing could have resulted in more than 90 percent global deep-ocean anoxia.

Though large-scale organic carbon burial acted as a negative feedback loop that partially mitigated the warming effects of volcanic discharge of carbon dioxide, resulting in the Plenus Cool Event during the Metoicoceras geslinianum European ammonite biozone during which global average temperatures fell by over 4 °C, it was insufficient at completely stopping the rise in global temperatures. This negative feedback was ultimately overridden, as global temperatures continued to shoot up in sync with continued volcanic release of carbon dioxide following the Plenus Cool Event.

Milankovitch cycles 
It has been hypothesised that the Cenomanian-Turonian boundary event occurred during a period of very low variability in Earth's insolation, which has been theorised to be the result of coincident nodes in all orbital parameters. Barring chaotic perturbations in Earth's and Mars' orbits, the simultaneous occurrence of nodes of orbital eccentricity, axial precession, and obliquity on Earth occurs approximately every 2.45 million years. Numerous other oceanic anoxic events occurred throughout the extremely warm greenhouse conditions of the Middle Cretaceous, and it has been suggested that these Middle Cretaceous ocean anoxic events occurred cyclically in accordance with orbital cycle patterns. The mid-Cenomanian Event (MCE), which occurred in the Rotalipora cushmani planktonic foraminifer biozone, has been argued to be another example supporting this hypothesis of regular oceanic anoxic events governed by Milankovitch cycles. The MCE took place approximately 2.4 million years before the Cenomanian-Turonian oceanic anoxic event, roughly at the time when an anoxic event would be expected to occur given such a cycle.

Enhanced phosphorus recycling 
A 2022 study found that the mineralisation of seafloor phosphorus into apatite was inhibited by the significantly lower pH of seawater and much warmer temperatures during the Cenomanian and Turonian compared to the present day, which meant that significantly more phosphorus was recycled back into ocean water after being deposited on the sea floor during this time. This would have intensified a positive feedback loop in which phosphorus is recycled faster into anoxic seawater compared to oxygen-rich water, which in turn fertilises the water, causes increased eutrophication, and further depletes the seawater of oxygen.

Sea level rise
A marine transgression in the latest Cenomanian resulted in an increase in average water depth, causing seawater to become less eutrophic in shallow, epicontinental seas. Turnovers in marine biota in such epicontinental seas have been suggested to be driven more so by changes in water depth rather than anoxia.

Effects 
The event brought about the extinction of the pliosaurs, and most ichthyosaurs. Coracoids of Maastrichtian age were once interpreted by some authors as belonging to ichthyosaurs, but these have since been interpreted as plesiosaur elements instead. Although the cause is still uncertain, the result starved the Earth's oceans of oxygen for nearly half a million years, causing the extinction of approximately 27 percent of marine invertebrates, including certain planktic and benthic foraminifera, mollusks, bivalves, dinoflagellates and calcareous nannofossils. The global environmental disturbance that resulted in these conditions increased atmospheric and oceanic temperatures. Boundary sediments show an enrichment of trace elements, and contain elevated δ13C values.

The δ13C isotope excursion 
The positive δ13C isotope excursion found at the Cenomanian-Turonian boundary is one of the main carbon isotope events of the Mesozoic. It represents one of the largest disturbances in the global carbon cycle from the past 110 million years. This δ13C isotope excursion indicates a significant increase in the burial rate of organic carbon, indicating the widespread deposition and preservation of organic carbon-rich sediments and that the ocean was depleted of oxygen at the time. Within the positive carbon isotope excursion, short eccentricity scale carbon isotope variability is documented in a significantly expanded OAE2 interval from southern Tibet.

Changes in oceanic biodiversity and its implications 
The alterations in diversity of various marine invertebrate species such as calcareous nannofossils indicate a time when the oceans were warm and oligotrophic, in an environment with short spikes of productivity followed by long periods of low fertility. A study performed in the Cenomanian-Turonian boundary of Wunstorf, Germany, reveal the uncharacteristic dominance of a calcareous nannofossil species, Watznaueria, present during the event. Unlike the Biscutum species, which prefer mesotrophic conditions and were generally the dominant species before and after the C/T boundary event; Watznaueria species prefer warm, oligotrophic conditions.

At the time, there were also peak abundances of the green algal groups Botryococcus and prasinophytes, coincident with pelagic sedimentation. The abundances of these algal groups are strongly related to the increase of both the oxygen deficiency in the water column and the total content of organic carbon. The evidence from these algal groups suggest that there were episodes of halocline stratification of the water column during the time. A species of freshwater dinocyst—Bosedinia—was also found in the rocks dated to the time and these suggest that the oceans had reduced salinity.

See also 
 Biodiversity of the Cenomanian and Turonian
 Cenomanian life
 Turonian life
 Cenomanian extinctions
 Turonian extinctions
 Extinction event
 Timeline of extinctions in the Holocene
 Toarcian turnover
 Cretaceous–Paleogene extinction event

References

Further reading 
 
 

Extinction events
 Ceno
 
 
Paleoclimatology